Algernon Percy, 1st Earl of Beverley was also known as Lord Algernon Percy from 1766-86.

Colonel Lord Algernon Malcolm Arthur Percy (2 October 1851 – 28 December 1933) was a British career soldier and Conservative politician who sat in the House of Commons from 1882 to 1887.

Percy was the second son of the 6th Duke of Northumberland and his wife Louisa Drummond, daughter of Henry Drummond of Albury Park, Surrey. He was educated at Eton and Christ Church, Oxford. From 1872 to 1880, he was a lieutenant in the Grenadier Guards. He was Major in the part-time 3rd (Royal Berkshire Militia) Battalion, Royal Berkshire Regiment from 1881 to 1886. He was also J.P. for Surrey.

In 1882, Percy was elected Member of Parliament for Westminster and held the seat until it was divided under the Redistribution of Seats Act 1885. In the 1885 general election, he was elected MP for St George's, Hanover Square, until he resigned his seat in 1887.

Percy transferred as a major from the 3rd Berkshires to the 3rd (Militia) Battalion of the Northumberland Fusiliers on 24 June 1886, and was promoted to lieutenant-colonel on 15 July 1895. In early 1900 he joined the regiment when it was stationed at Malta. He was appointed in command of the Tyne Volunteer Infantry Brigade on 5 March 1902, with the rank of colonel in the Volunteer Force whilst so serving. In the 1902 Coronation Honours list he was on 26 June 1902 appointed an aide-de-camp to King Edward VII, with the regular rank of colonel. He served as such until the King's death in 1910, and was re-appointed ADC to King George V from 1910 to 1920.

He was High Sheriff of Warwickshire in 1910, sometime County Alderman of Warwickshire and Chairman of Warwickshire County Council.

Percy married Lady Victoria Edgcumbe (a daughter of the 4th Earl of Mount Edgcumbe) on 3 August 1880 and they had two children:

Algernon William (1884–1916), killed (unmarried) aboard  at the Battle of Jutland.
Katharine Louisa Victoria (1882–1964), married her cousin, Josceline Heber-Percy, and had issue.

Percy and his wife had made their home at Guy's Cliffe, near Warwick.

References

1851 births
1933 deaths
Younger sons of dukes
People educated at Eton College
Alumni of Christ Church, Oxford
Grenadier Guards officers
Royal Berkshire Militia officers
Royal Northumberland Fusiliers officers
Conservative Party (UK) MPs for English constituencies
High Sheriffs of Warwickshire
UK MPs 1880–1885
UK MPs 1885–1886
UK MPs 1886–1892